Rafael Gomes dos Santos (born 12 July 1980, in Rio de Janeiro, Brazil), sometimes known as just Gomes, is a Brazilian footballer who plays as a defender for Bonsucesso Futebol Clube.

Career
Gomes started his professional career in Brazil, playing for Vasco de Gama, Bragantino, Olaria and Atletico Mineiro. He later moved to Portugal to play for CD Santa Clara before moving to Colorado Rapids in 2008.

He made his Rapids debut as a substitute during a 2–0 loss to San Jose Earthquakes on April 19, 2008. In January 2010 Náutico have signed the centre-back from Goiás.

References

External links
 CBF

1980 births
Living people
Brazilian footballers
Colorado Rapids players
Esteghlal F.C. players
C.D. Santa Clara players
Figueirense FC players
Goiás Esporte Clube players
Clube Náutico Capibaribe players
Vila Nova Futebol Clube players
Madureira Esporte Clube players
Itumbiara Esporte Clube players
Brazilian expatriate footballers
Expatriate footballers in Iran
Expatriate soccer players in the United States
Brazilian expatriate sportspeople in Iran
Brazilian expatriate sportspeople in the United States
Footballers from Rio de Janeiro (city)
Major League Soccer players
Association football defenders